Breakin' the Funk is the third album by American funk band Faze-O, released in 1979.  It was released on She Records, a subsidiary of Atlantic Records.

Track listing 
 Breakin' the Funk - 6:00 (Keith Harrison, Ralph Aikens Jr., Robert Neal Jr.)
 Ya-ba-da-ba-duzie - 6:10 (Harrison, Neal Jr., Clarence Satchell)
 I Still Love You - 6:00 (Harrison, Neal Jr.)
 Let's Rock - 6:40 (Satchell, Harrison, Aikens Jr., Frederick Crum)
 I'm Thankful - 6:10 (Harrison, Neal Jr.)
 See You Through the Night - 4:52 (Satchell, Harrison, Aikens Jr., Neal Jr., Roger Parker)

Personnel
Robert Neal, Jr: Vocals, Percussion
Harry McLoud: Rhythm Guitar
Ralph Aikens Jr.: Rhythm and Lead Guitar, Vocals
Keith Harrison: Keyboards, Moog and String Synthesizer, Acoustic and Electric Pianos, Clavinet, Percussion, Vocals
Randy Brecker: Trumpet
Frederick Tyrone Crum: Bass, Backing Vocals
Roger Parker: Drums, Percussion
Strings arranged by Mitch Farber

Production
Arranged by Keith Harrison
Produced by Clarence Satchell; co-produced by Keith Harrison
Recorded by Gary Clapp
Mixed at Mediasound by Michael Brauer
Mastered at Sterling Sound by Ted Jensen
All songs copyright Match Publishing (BMI)

1979 albums
Faze-O albums
Atlantic Records albums